The Art of Love is a 2011 French comedy film directed and written by Emmanuel Mouret. The film stars Mouret himself, Pascale Arbillot, Ariane Ascaride, Frédérique Bel, François Cluzet, Julie Depardieu, Judith Godrèche, Stanislas Merhar, Elodie Navarre, Laurent Stocker and Gaspard Ulliel, and is narrated by Philippe Torreton.

The Art of Love premiered at the Locarno International Film Festival on 7 August 2011. Although it garnered rather mixed reviews by film critics, it won the Best Screenplay Award at the Montréal World Film Festival, and the Foreign Press Award at Filmfest Hamburg.

Plot summary 

The Art of Love is composed of several chapters, which follows several Parisian couples. Isabelle (Julie Depardieu) has not had sex in a year. She declines an offer from her friend Zoé (Pascale Arbillot) to "borrow" her husband and instead winds up impersonating Amélie (Judith Godrèche), another friend who cannot bring herself to sleep with her buddy, Boris (Laurent Stocker). The singleton Achille (François Cluzet) thinks his prayers have been answered when his svelte new neighbour (Frédérique Bel) knocks on his door wearing a negligee and suggests they have an affair. In another chapter, a middle-aged couple’s marriage is threatened when wife Emmanuelle (Ariane Ascaride) finds herself lusting after every attractive man she lays eyes upon and a pair of young lovers (Elodie Navarre and Gaspard Ulliel) discover the pangs of jealousy.

Cast 
 Emmanuel Mouret as Louis
 François Cluzet as Achille
 Frédérique Bel as Achille's neighbor
 Julie Depardieu as Isabelle
 Judith Godrèche as Amélie
 Laurent Stocker as Boris
 Elodie Navarre as Vanessa
 Gaspard Ulliel as William
 Pascale Arbillot as Zoé
 Ariane Ascaride as Emmanuelle
 Stanislas Merhar as Laurent
 Louis-Do de Lencquesaing as Ludovic
 Philippe Magnan as Paul
 Michaël Cohen as Zoé's husband
 Philippe Torreton as Narrator (voice)

Release 
The Art of Love premiered at the Locarno International Film Festival on 7 August 2011. It was then shown at the Namur Francophone Film Festival on 3 October 2011. Two days later, on 5 October, the film had its premiere in Germany at the Hamburg Film Festival. In the United Kingdom, The Art of Love premiered at the BFI London Film Festival on 25 October 2011. The film was released theatrically in France on 27 November. As of March 2012, it was also distributed in Switzerland, Belgium, Canada and Hungary. The film will be theatrically released in Germany on 17 May 2012.

Reception

Critical response 
The Art of Love received mixed to positive reviews. The Première magazine gave it two out of four stars, describing the cast performances as "convincing", but also calling the film "predictable". Isabelle Zirbi of the Les Cahiers du cinéma praised Emmanuel Mouret's directing and writing ideas, awarding the film with three out of four stars. Le Nouvel Observateur reviewed the film more positively, naming it a "delicious patchwork of plots and characters", and gave it four out of five stars. Le Figaro awarded The Art of Love with three stars out of four, as well as Les Inrockuptibles, StudioCiné Live and Télérama. The reviews of Le Parisien, Elle and A voir à lire were more rigid, although they praised the film's comedic situations.

Foreign critiques similarly reviewed the film. Neil Young of The Hollywood Reporter positively reviewed the film, comparing it to the works of Woody Allen, but adding that "some promising ideas in this high-toned romantic comedy get smothered by an over-complicated presentation". Jey Weissberg of the Variety wrote "Mouret's rep and stellar cast mean local biz should be strong [...], but it will take more than art for 'Love' to transcend borders" and gave the film a mixed review. The Time Out gave it three out of five stars, naming it the "frothy fun". Dan Fainaru of the Screen Daily reviewed The Art of Love positively.

Accolades 
On 28 August 2011, Emmanuel Mouret won the Best Screenplay Award at the Montréal World Film Festival. The film was also honoured with the Foreign Press Award at the Hamburg Film Festival.

References

External links 

2011 comedy films
2011 films
Films set in France
Films set in Paris
Films shot in France
Films shot in Paris
French comedy films
2010s French-language films
Films directed by Emmanuel Mouret
2010s French films